The following is a list of songs produced, co-produced and remixed by American hip hop record producer Ron Browz.

Singles produced
1998 
"Ebonics" (Big L)
"Size 'Em Up" (Big L)
2003
"Blow It Out" (Ludacris)
2005
"I'll Whip Ya Head Boy" (50 Cent featuring Young Buck) 
2006
"Help" (Lloyd Banks featuring Keri Hilson)
"Bring It Back" (Jae Millz featuring Jadakiss)
2008
"The Good Stuff" (Jim Jones featuring NOE)
"Pop Champagne" (Jim Jones and Ron Browz featuring Juelz Santana)
"Arab Money" (Busta Rhymes featuring Ron Browz)
"Jumping (Out the Window)" (Ron Browz)
2009
"Rotate" (C-N-N featuring Busta Rhymes & Ron Browz)
2010
"Man Down" (Ja Rule)
2014 
"Park Day" (Zumo Kollie)

2000

Big L - The Big Picture
02. "Ebonics" 
03. "Size 'Em Up"
07. "The Heist"
11. "Casualties of a Dice Game"

2001

Nas - Stillmatic
02. "Ether"

2002

Fat Joe - Loyalty
13. "We Run This Shit"

Nas - God's Son
04. "Last Real Nigga Alive"

2003

Ludacris - Chicken-n-Beer
02. "Blow It Out"
18. "Blow It Out (Remix)" (featuring 50 Cent)

DMX - Grand Champ
10. "Fuck Y'all"

Lil' Kim - La Bella Mafia
17. "What's The Word" (Japanese Bonus Track)

2004

Snoop Dogg - R&G (Rhythm & Gangsta): The Masterpiece
14. "Oh No" (featuring 50 Cent)

Lloyd Banks - The Hunger for More
02. "Playboy"

2005

Black Market Militia - Black Market Militia
11. "Paintbrush" (featuring Young Buck)

50 Cent - Get Rich or Die Tryin' (soundtrack)
18. "I'll Whip Ya Head Boy" (featuring Young Buck)

Tony Yayo - Thoughts of a Predicate Felon
14. "G-Shit"

Funkmaster Flex - Car Show Tour
7. "Bring It Back" (featuring Jae Millz & Jadakiss)

Papoose - Menace II Society (Part 2)
11. "New Era"

2006

Joe Budden - Mood Muzik 2: Can It Get Any Worse?
03. "Old School Mouse"
10. "Young Niggaz"

Webstar - Webstar Presents: Caught in the Web
01. "I Just Came To Dance" (featuring Young B.)
02. "Don't Stop" (featuring Young B., Ron Browz, Severe and T-Rex)
04. "In My Video" (featuring Young B.)
05. "Get Higher" (featuring Young B. & Young We)

Lloyd Banks - Rotten Apple
03. "Playboy 2"
07. "Help" (featuring Keri Hilson)

Oshy - Da Life of a Singer
10. "Give Me What I'm Asking 4"

Lil Wayne & Juelz Santana - Blow: The 'I Can't Feel My Face' Prequel
10. "Rewind"

2007

Lumidee - Unexpected
11. "You Got Me" (featuring N.O.R.E.)

Cashis - The County Hound EP
07. "Thoughts of Suicide"

Lake - American Rat Killer
02. "American Rat"
06. "No Happy Ending"
07. "My Hood"

Ron Browz, Kartier, & The Heatmakerz - This Is Crack Music
07. "Go Girl"
08. "Like That"
13. "Wishing On A Star"

Jae Millz - Zone Out Season V. 1
18. "Horror Movie" (featuring Al Doe & Remy Ma)

Remy Ma - PunishHer
00. "Fresh"

2008

Ron Browz - The Wonder Years
01. "The Co-Sign" (Performed by Jadakiss & Gravy)
02. "Shoot Me A Fair One" (Performed by Papoose)
03. "Old School Mouse" (Performed by Joe Budden)
04. "I’m Hollywood" (Performed by Ron Browz)
05. "Horror" (Performed by Jae Millz)
06. "What They Want" (Performed by Stack Bundles)
07. "Nah" (Performed by J-Hood)
08. "Drama" (Performed by Loaded Lux)
09. "Young Niggaz" (Performed by Joe Budden)
10. "Streets" (Performed by Ransom & Dj Clue)
11. "Da Goons" (Performed by Traffik)
12. "Act Stupid" (Performed by Ransom, Stack Bundles & Bynoe)
13. "Ride Out" (Performed by Skyzoo)
14. "Don’t Move" (Performed by Murda Mook, Stack Bundles & T-Rex)
15. "This Is It" (Performed by Harlem’s Cash)
16. "Crack Music" (Performed by Arsonist, Ron Browz & Karty)
17. "Skates On" (Performed by Ron Browz)
18. "The Can’t Wait" (Performed by Shakez & Cardi)
19. "What’s Flow" (Performed by Ron Browz)

G-Unit - T.O.S: Terminate on Sight
01. "Straight Outta Southside"
16. "Money Makes the World Go Round"

Team Blackout - Lights Out
12. J5 On 'Em

Killer Mike - Ghetto Extraordinary
08. Chose Me (featuring S.L. Jones & Scar)

Jim Jones - The Good Stuff - Single
00. "The Good Stuff" (featuring NOE)

2009

C-N-N - Channel 10
03. "Rotate" (featuring Ron Browz & Busta Rhymes)

Jim Jones - Pray IV Reign
04. "How to Be a Boss" (featuring Ludacris & NOE)
14. "Pop Champagne" (with Ron Browz featuring Juelz Santana)
15. "Rain" (featuring Rell, NOE & Starr)

Bow Wow - New Jack City II
02. "What They Call Me" (featuring Ron Browz & Nelly) (Co-produced by Jermaine Dupri)

Lloyd Banks - 4-30-09
05. "Luv Witch Ya Boy" (featuring Ron Browz)

Busta Rhymes - Back on My B.S.
02. "Give Em What They Askin For"
07. "Arab Money" (featuring Ron Browz)

R. Kelly - The Demo Tape
03. "Club to a Bedroom" (featuring Ron Browz)

Nicki Minaj - Beam Me Up Scotty
02. "I Get Crazy" (featuring Lil Wayne)
04. "Kill Da DJ"

Fat Joe - Jealous Ones Still Envy 2 (J.O.S.E. 2)
01. "Winding On Me" (featuring Ron Browz & Lil Wayne)

2010

Ron Browz - EtherBoy (shelved)
00. "Pop Champagne"
00. "Jumping (Out the Window)"
00. "I Promise" (featuring Busta Rhymes)
00. "Simple Man" (featuring Keri Hilson & Juelz Santana)
00. "20 Dollarz" 
00. "Wheels Fall Off" (featuring Lloyd Banks)
00. "She's What I Like" (featuring Bobby Valentino)
00. "She's My Homie" (featuring Oshy)
00. "Got Curved"
00. "Undress You"
00. "20 Dollars (Remix) (featuring Mase, Nicki Minaj, Shawty Lo & OJ Da Juiceman)
00. "Cheese and Crackers"
00. "She's A Biker"  (featuring Foxy Brown)

Ron Browz - Etherlibrium
01. "Etherlibrium Intro" (featuring Oshy)
02. "Wishing On a Star" (featuring Maino, Fred Da God & Malaika Russel)
03. "In a Zone"
04. "Don’t Breathe It"
05. "What Up Bro Remix" (featuring Red Cafe)
06. "Good Morning" (featuring J.R. Writer)
07. "You Can Blossom"
08. "Put ya Hands Up"
09. "Winded"
10. Skit
11. "Slow Motion"
12. "Start Off Walking"
13. "Halftime 2010"
14. "Wanna Be You"
15. "I Swear" (featuring Sharp A Don)
16. "Etherboy Allstars" (featuring Pretty Boy Maloy, Mone & M5)

2013

Papoose - The Nacirema Dream
03. "Mother Ghetto"
17. "Get At Me" (featuring Ron Browz)

2014

Mani Miles - TBA
00. "Bars" (featuring Cassidy & Murda Mook)

2015

Papoose - You Can't Stop Destiny
01. "The Bank"
05. "Michael Jackson" (featuring Remy Ma & Ty Dolla $ign)

Method Man - The Meth Lab
03. "Straight Gutta" (featuring Redman, Hanz On & Streetlife)

2016

Smoke DZA - George Kush Da Button (Don't Pass Trump the Blunt)
04. "Where the Weed"

Upcoming

Ja Rule - Renaissance Project
04. "Man Down"

Miscellaneous
Amerie
"After Everything"
Bradhurst
"What Your Man Don't Know" (featuring Ron Browz)
Cardan
"Heading To The Telly" (featuring Ron Browz)
Jae Millz
"Who"
Juelz Santana
"I Wanna Bone" (featuring Un Kasa & Sen City)
Knocka 
"Heavy in The Club" (featuring Ron Browz & Young Truth)
"Say They Ballin'" (featuring Ron Browz & Nefu Da Don)
Mase
"Thinkin About You" 
Q Da Kid 
"I Talk Money" (featuring Ron Browz)
SF
"Sak Pase" (featuring Ron Browz)
Traffik
"Goonz"

References

External links 
 
 
 

Production discographies
 
 
Hip hop discographies
Discographies of American artists